Sikannisuchus is an extinct genus of large archosaur from upper Triassic (Norian stage) deposits of northeastern British Columbia, Canada. It is known from the holotype, TMP 94.382.3, a posterior portion of skull roof and from other fragmentary remains. It was found from four localities of the Pardonet Formation, near the community of Sikanni Chief. It was first named by Elizabeth L. Nicholls, Donald B. Brinkman, and Xiao-Chun Wu in 1998 and the type species is Sikannisuchus huskyi.

References

Prehistoric reptile genera
Late Triassic archosaurs of North America
Middle Triassic archosaurs
Fossil taxa described in 1998